Harry Everett "Bud" Abell (born December 21, 1940) is a former American football linebacker in the American Football League for the Kansas City Chiefs. He played college football at the University of Missouri.

Early years
Abell was born in Kansas City, Missouri and attended Southeast High School. He accepted a football scholarship from the University of Missouri. As a sophomore, he became a starter at right defensive end. He was a two-way player and also was an offensive end.

Professional career
Abell was selected by the Kansas City Chiefs in the 23rd round (178th overall) of the 1964 AFL Draft with a future draft pick, which allowed the team to draft him before his college eligibility was over. He was also selected by the Dallas Cowboys in the 17th round (228th overall) of the 1964 NFL Draft. 

On June 1, 1965, he signed with the Kansas City Chiefs. He was converted into an outside linebacker during training camp. On September 2, the Chiefs claimed rookie Chuck Hurston, placing Abell on the injury deferred list to make room for him.

In 1966, he participated in his first regular season as a part of the team that won the AFL Championship and that played in Super Bowl I. The next year, he became a starter after E. J. Holub was injured. 

In 1968, he returned to a reserve role after he was passed on the depth chart by rookie Jim Lynch. That season he recorded his only 2 career interceptions. 

On August 25, 1969, he was traded to the Denver Broncos in exchange for a conditional draft choice (not exercised). He was released by the Broncos on September 9.

References

1940 births
Living people
Players of American football from Kansas City, Missouri
American football linebackers
Missouri Tigers football players
Kansas City Chiefs players
American Football League players